Minor Radvilos Palace is a former palace of the Radziwiłł family in Vilnius, Lithuania. The palace was originally built in the 17th century and was reconstructed twice in 1796–1810 and 1987–1989. Currently, it houses the Lithuanian Theater, Music and Cinema Museum.

References

Palaces in Vilnius
Castles and palaces of the Radziwiłł family